Maria Magdalena Dumitrache (born 3 May 1977) is a Romanian rower, who won gold at the 2000 Summer Olympics. She first competed as an elite rower at the 1998 World Rowing Championships where she came fifth with the women's four, and won gold with the women's eight. She retained the world championship title at the 1999 World Rowing Championships. She retired after competing in a 2001 World Rowing Cup race.

References

External links 
 
 
 
 

1977 births
Living people
Romanian female rowers
Olympic rowers of Romania
Olympic gold medalists for Romania
Rowers at the 2000 Summer Olympics
Olympic medalists in rowing
Medalists at the 2000 Summer Olympics
World Rowing Championships medalists for Romania
Sportspeople from Târgoviște